Jordan High School, formerly David Starr Jordan High School, is a public comprehensive four-year high school in Los Angeles. Until October 2020, the school was named for David Starr Jordan, the first president of Stanford University (from 1891 to 1913). The school colors are Royal  blue and white and the mascot is a  bulldog.

Some sections of Florence-Graham, an unincorporated neighborhood in Los Angeles County, are jointly zoned to Jordan and John C. Fremont High School. The Gonzaque Village, Imperial Courts, Jordan Downs, and Nickerson Gardens public housing developments of Los Angeles are zoned to Jordan.

Jordan is one of a few high schools to have three, unrelated, Olympic gold medalists come from the same high school in Hayes Edward Sanders, Florence Griffith-Joyner and Kevin Young. Sanders, in 1952, became the first African American to win the Olympic Heavyweight Boxing Championship while Griffith-Joyner still holds the current World Record in her respective event.

It was in the Los Angeles City High School District until 1961, when it merged into LAUSD.

With public input from the local community, the Los Angeles Unified School District school board unanimously voted in October 2020 to officially shorten the name of the school to "Jordan High School" and remove all references to David Starr Jordan.

Modernization
From early 2015 through late 2016 Jordan High School was temporarily closed for modernizations and new construction at the school. Students moved to a different school during renovations.

Prior to the 2005 opening of South East High School, Jordan served portions of the City of South Gate.

In March 2017 LAUSD sued the Los Angeles Housing Authority, stating that contaminants seeped onto the Jordan site from the neighboring Jordan Downs housing project.

Notable alumni

 Dunia Elvir , television journalist, producer, motivational speaker and autism advocate.
Earl Battey, former professional baseball player (Chicago White Sox, Washington Senators, Minnesota Twins)
Ron Downing, City Manager, UCLA and Harvard University
George Brown, long jumper

Buddy Collette, jazz saxophonist
Ray Vasquez,  Singer, Trombonist, and actor 
Michael Douglass, All-Pro linebacker for the Green Bay Packers and San Diego Chargers; owner of Alpine Fitness and M.D. Fitness in San Diego. 2003 Packers Hall of Fame inductee. 
Joey Fatts, rapper
Florence Griffith-Joyner, multiple-Olympic gold medalist and current world record holder in the 100 meters and 200 meters
Art Harris, former professional basketball player
Aaron Holbert, former professional baseball player (St. Louis Cardinals, Cincinnati Reds) and current manager of the Mississippi Braves
Ray Holbert, former professional baseball player (San Diego Padres, Montreal Expos, Atlanta Braves, Kansas City Royals)
Bobby Darwin, former professional baseball player (Los Angeles Angels, Los Angeles Dodgers, Minnesota Twins, Milwaukee Brewers, Boston Red Sox, Chicago Cubs)
Brenda Holloway, Motown recording artist
Leon Hooten, former professional baseball player (Oakland Athletics)
Gail Hopkins, former professional baseball player (Chicago White Sox, Kansas City Royals, Los Angeles Dodgers)

Le-Lo Lang, NFL cornerback
Charles Mingus, jazz bassist
Manny Montana, actor
Roger E. Mosley, actor
Clarence Otis, Jr., CEO Darden Restaurants (Olive Garden, LongHorn Steakhouse, and Red Lobster)

Wally Parks, founder of the National Hot Rod Association (NHRA), Class of 1931
Fletcher Joseph Perry, NFL Hall of Fame running back
Ron Riley, former professional basketball player
Hayes Edward Sanders, Olympic heavyweight boxing gold medalist; first African American to win Olympic heavyweight title
Walter "Scotty" Scott, member of R&B group, The Whispers
Paul Scranton, professional basketball player
Glenn T. Seaborg, discoverer of Plutonium and 1951 Nobel Prize–winning chemist 
Sylvester, disco singer and drag queen, graduated in 1969
James Washington, NFL player
Britt Woodman, jazz trombonist, Class of 1938
Kevin Young, 1992 Olympic gold medalist, former world record holder in 400 meter hurdles

References

External links

 

Educational institutions established in 1923
Los Angeles Unified School District schools
High schools in Los Angeles
High schools in Los Angeles County, California
Public high schools in California
Watts, Los Angeles
1923 establishments in California